The 2017–18 Texas A&M–Corpus Christi Islanders women's basketball team represented Texas A&M University–Corpus Christi in the 2017–18 NCAA Division I women's basketball season. The Islanders were led by sixth year head coach Royce Chadwick. They played their home games at the American Bank Center and the Dugan Wellness Center and were members of the Southland Conference. They finished the season 19–12, 11–7 in Southland play to finish in a three way tie for fourth place. They advanced to the semifinals of the Southland women's tournament where they lost to Nicholls State.

Previous season
The Islanders finished the season 14–18 overall and 8–10 in Southland play to finish tied for sixth place. They were 2-1 as fifth seed in the Southland women's tournament.  Their season ended losing to tournament champion Central Arkansas in the Semifinal round.

Media
Video streaming of all non-televised home games and audio for all road games is available at GoIslanders.com.

Roster
Sources:

Schedule and Results
Sources:

|-
!colspan=9 style="background:#0067C5; color:#FFFFFF;"| Non-conference regular season

|-
!colspan=9 style="background:#0067C5; color:#FFFFFF;"| Southland regular season

|-
!colspan=9 style="background:#0067C5; color:#FFFFFF;"| Southland Women's Tournament

See also
2017–18 Texas A&M–Corpus Christi Islanders men's basketball team

References

Texas A&M–Corpus Christi Islanders women's basketball seasons
Texas AandM-Corpus Christi
Texas AandM-Corpus Christi Islanders basketball
Texas AandM-Corpus Christi Islanders basketball